The Unknown Tomorrow (German: Das unbekannte Morgen) is a 1923 German silent drama film directed by Alexander Korda and starring Werner Krauss, María Corda, and Olga Limburg.

Production and reception
The Unknown Tomorrow was the first film made by Korda in Germany, after he had left Austria following the failure of Samson and Delilah. The film was a financial success, and Korda used his share of the profits to buy a stake in the film distribution company FIHAG.

Werner Krauss's performance has been noted for its expressionist acting, even though much of the rest of the film is non-expressionist.

Cast
 Werner Krauss as Marc Muradock 
 María Corda as Stella Manners 
 Olga Limburg as Zoé, Maid 
 Carl Ebert as Gordon Manners 
 Louis Ralph as Alphonse, Muradock's accomplice 
 Friedrich Kühne as Raorama Singh 
 Antonie Jaeckel as the Aunt 
 Paul Lukas as Minor role

Plot
A wife is wrongly believed of adultery by her husband who leaves her. She then struggles to prove her innocence and win him back while foiling the machinations of an admirer of hers who wishes to keep her apart from her husband.

References

Bibliography
 Kulik, Karol. Alexander Korda: The Man Who Could Work Miracles. Virgin Books, 1990.

External links

1923 films
Films of the Weimar Republic
German silent feature films
German drama films
Films directed by Alexander Korda
German films based on plays
1923 drama films
Films produced by Alexander Korda
German black-and-white films
Silent drama films
1920s German films